Lavernay is a commune in the Doubs département in the Bourgogne-Franche-Comté region in eastern France.

Geography

Population

The inhabitants of the commune are called Lavernois.

See also
 Communes of the Doubs department

References

External links

 Lavernay on the intercommunal Web site of the department 

Communes of Doubs